Live... Greetings from the Flow State is a 2003 live album by Dishwalla.

Track listing
 "Stay Awake"
 "Mad Life"
 "Once in a While"
 "Home"
 "Moisture"
 "Angels or Devils"
 "Counting Blue Cars"
 "Somewhere in the Middle"
 "Every Little Thing"
 "Give"
 "Haze"
 "So Much Time"

Credits
J.R. Richards: Vocals, guitar, keyboards
Rodney Browning Cravens: guitars, vocals
Scot Alexander: Bass, vocals
Pete Maloney: Drums, percussion, vocals
Jim Woods: Keyboards, vocals

Dishwalla albums
2003 live albums